Filatima zagulajevi is a moth of the family Gelechiidae. It is found in the European part of southern Russia (the Volga-Don region, the Lower Volga and southern Ural).

The wingspan is about 16 mm. The forewings are brownish grey, with dark brown spots with red-brown encircling. The hindwings are light grey and semi-transparent.

Etymology
The species is named for Russian specialist in microlepidoptera Aleksei Konstantinovich Zagulyaev.

References

Moths described in 1996
Filatima